Leonid Efros (Леонид Эфрос) is a Russian oil painter and enamellist best known for making drawings and paintings of European royalty, including Britain's Queen Elizabeth II, the Queen Mother, Princess Anne and Princess Michael of Kent. He drew the Queen during a 2-hour sitting in March 1992 alongside long-time collaborator Alexei Maximov. His drawings formed the basis of an exhibition of enamels at the Kremlin Armoury in 1994. Examples of his work are held in the Kremlin's permanent collection as well as other important Russian galleries. His work has also been exhibited at the Moscow City Museum and the F.M. Dostoevsky Literary and Memorial Museum in Leningrad (St. Petersburg).

References

External links 
 

Living people
20th-century Russian painters
Russian male painters
21st-century Russian painters
Russian portrait painters
Russian enamellers
20th-century enamellers
21st-century enamellers
Year of birth missing (living people)
20th-century Russian male artists
21st-century Russian male artists